Notoceratops (meaning "southern horned face") is a dubious genus of extinct ornithischian dinosaur based on an incomplete, toothless left dentary (now lost) from the Late Cretaceous of Patagonia (in Argentina), probably dating to the Campanian or Maastrichtian. It was most likely a ceratopsian and it was found in the Lago Colhué Huapi Formation.

Discovery and naming
In 1918, palaeontologist Augusto Tapia (1893–1966) discovered the genus holotype. He also named the type species, N. bonarellii (originally spelt as Notoceratops Bonarelli), in 1918. The generic name is derived from Greek notos, "the south", keras, "horn" and ops, "face". The specific name honours Guido Bonarelli (1871-1951), who advised Tapia in his study of the find. By present conventions the epithet is spelled bonarellii, thus without a capital B. In many later publications the specific name is misspelled "bonarelli", with a single "i", from the incorrect assumption it would be derived from a Latinised "Bonarell~ius". The fossil, found near the Lago Colhué Huapi in Chubut, was eventually described by Friedrich von Huene in 1929, but it has since been lost.

Phylogeny
Originally referred as a ceratopsian by Tapia in 1918, it was later dismissed because no other members of that group were known from the Southern Hemisphere. However, the 2003 discovery of another possible ceratopsian, Serendipaceratops, from Australia could change this view. Notoceratops has since been considered a nomen dubium and may have been a hadrosaur instead. An analysis published by Tom Rich et al. in 2014, which focused on the validity of Serendipaceratops, also examined the published material from Notoceratops. They concluded that the holotype had ceratopsian features and that the genus is probably valid.

References

Ornithischian genera
Late Cretaceous dinosaurs of South America
Fossil taxa described in 1918
Cretaceous Argentina